The 1910 Chicago Maroons football team was an American football team that represented the University of Chicago during the 1910 college football season.  In their 19th season under head coach Amos Alonzo Stagg, the Maroons compiled a 2–5 record, finished in fifth place in the Western Conference with a 2–4 record against conference opponents, and were outscored by their opponents by a combined total of 66 to 24.

Schedule

Roster

Head coach: Amos Alonzo Stagg (19th year at Chicago)

References

Chicago
Chicago Maroons football seasons
Chicago Maroons football